"Not a Dry Eye in the House" is a song composed and written by Diane Warren, and recorded by Meat Loaf. The song was released on January 15, 1996, as the second single from the album Welcome to the Neighborhood. It peaked at number seven in the UK, becoming Meat Loaf's last top-10 hit there until "It's All Coming Back to Me Now" in 2006. It was the last US charting single to be released in Meat Loaf's lifetime before his death in January 2022.

Music video
The video for "Not a Dry Eye in the House" consisted of Meat Loaf overlooking an old theater stage. During the song he remembers the girl of his dreams leaving him (she was an old movie starlet). Aged, he goes back into flashbacks and overlooks the various times she broke his heart and cries out in song. This music video was directed by Howard Greenhalgh.

Track listings
US maxi-CD single
 "Not a Dry Eye in the House" (Somewhere in Time Edit) – 5:02
 "Let It Be" – 2:26
 "Come Together" – 3:16
 "I'd Lie for You (And That's the Truth)" (Live at the Beacon Theater, New York – October 1995) (feat. Patti Russo) – 7:23

European CD singles

In Europe, there were two version released of the single. The first version contained live versions of "Where the Rubber Meets the Road" and "I'd Lie for You (And That's the Truth)", while the other had two Beatles' covers, "Let It Be" and "Come Together".

Charts

Release history

References

1995 singles
1995 songs
MCA Records singles
Meat Loaf songs
Song recordings produced by Ron Nevison
Songs written by Diane Warren
Virgin Records singles
Music videos directed by Howard Greenhalgh